The 2014 Tyrepower Tasmania 400 was a motor race meeting for the Australian sedan-based V8 Supercars. It was the second event of the 2014 International V8 Supercars Championship. It was held on the weekend of 28–30 March at the Symmons Plains Raceway, near Launceston, Tasmania.

References 

Tasmania